Raquel! was a 1970 CBS television special starring Raquel Welch, Tom Jones, Bob Hope and John Wayne executive produced, directed and choreographed by David Winters produced by Winters' company Winters-Rosen for CBS-TV, originally co-sponsored by Coca-Cola and Motorola. On the day of the premiere, the show received a 51% share on the National ARB Ratings and an Overnight New York Nielsen Rating of 58% share.

Production
Raquel! was filmed in London, Paris, Acapulco, Mexico City, Yucatan, Big Sur, and Los Angeles and featured lavish production numbers.  It marked Welch's debut special on television.  Together Welch and Jones combined musical and comedic talents on classic rock 'n' roll standards of the era.

Although Welch sings throughout the show, she briefly recites "The Lady of Shalott", a ballad by the Victorian poet Alfred, Lord Tennyson.

The special, considered by some to be a classic '70s timepiece, unites pop-culture icons in their prime. The multimillion-dollar, TV song & dance extravaganza was filmed around the world - from Paris to Mexico. Lavish production numbers of classic songs from the era, extravagant Bob Mackie -designed costumes and guest performances. Tom Jones was nearly a co-star, as he sang the long medley of Little Richard and Beatles songs with Raquel, but not before he opened the set with a solo.  Even Bob Hope sang a duet, the Beatles' "Rocky Raccoon".

The DVD release 
The home video of the special was released by V.I.E.W. in 1998.  It is very light on special features.  Included are a three-page biography of Welch, a single screen biography of Jones and a Welch photo gallery consisting of scenes from the special, and voiceover from the special.  Unlike other vintage TV specials on DVD, no commentary track was present.

Guest stars

Guest stars John Wayne and Bob Hope in the Wild West only added to the largeness of the production..
Welch and Jones,  both, two of the 70s biggest stars, joined by such legendary greats made it an indispensable time capsule full of glamor, wit and talent.

Music listing
Fourteen songs from the era are featured, although many are in the form of medley.  Welch and friends sang songs by the Beatles, Little Richard, The Mamas & the Papas and many others.  The oldest was not much older than five years from original release.

References

External links
 
 

1970s American television specials
1970 television specials
1970 in American television